The Chickasha Chiefs were a minor league baseball team based in Chickasha, Oklahoma. The Chiefs played as members of the Class D level Sooner State League from 1948 to 1952, qualifying for the league playoffs on four occasions. The Chiefs teams hosted minor league home games at Borden Park.

History
The Chiefs were immediately preceded in minor league baseball play by the 1922, the Chickasha Chicks, who won a championship in their final season of pay in the Oklahoma State League. The franchise folded following the season.

In 1948, the Chickasha Chiefs began play in the Class D level Sooner State League. The Chiefs and Pauls Valley Raiders were expansion teams in the league as it expanded from six–teams to eight–teams after forming in 1947. The other 1948 Sooner State League members were the Ada Herefords, Ardmore Indians, Duncan Cementers, Lawton Giants, McAlester Rockets and Seminole Oilers.
 
Chickasha qualified for the Sooner State League playoffs in 1948. The Chicks finished 73–63, placing fourth in the regular season standings. In the playoffs, the McAlester Rockets defeated the Chickasha Chiefs three games to one. The Chiefs 1948 attendance was 35,640, an average of 524 per game.

Returning to the playoffs in 1949, the Chickasha Chicks finished the regular season with a 78–61 record, placing third in the regular season. In the 1949 playoffs, the Lawton Giants defeated Chickasha three games to none. The Chicks 1949 attendance was 59,306, an average of 853.

The 1950 Chickasha Chiefs finished 80–59, to again place third in the Sooner State League regular season. Qualifying for the playoffs, the McAlester Rockets defeated the Chiefs three games to none. The 1950 season attendance was 43,759 (3rd in the league).

In 1951, the Chickasha Chiefs used five managers in placing seventh and finishing with a 46–94 record in the Sooner State League. The 1951 season attendance was 21,107.

The Chickasha Chiefs returned to the Sooner State League playoffs in 1952. The Chiefs finished 78–62, placing third in the 1952 regular season standings. In the playoffs, the Pauls Valley Raiders defeated the Chickasha Chiefs three games to one. Season attendance was 27,494, an average of 393 per game.

the Chickasha Chiefs folded after the 1952 season and were replaced by the Gainesville Owls in the 1953 Sooner State League. Chickasha has not hosted another minor league team.

The ballpark
The Chickasha Chiefs played minor league home games at Memorial Park, also referred to as Borden Park. Borden Park burned in August 1950 and was rebuilt for the following season. The ballpark had a capacity of 1,700 (1950) and 2,500 (1952). Borden Park, which is now called Elliott Field and is used for high school baseball, is located at 200 North 19th Street.

Timeline

Year–by–year records

Notable alumni

Ed Cole (1950)
Camilo Pascual (1951) Minnesota Twins Hall of Fame
Pete Runnels (1949) 5× MLB All-Star, 2× AL batting champion (1960, 1962), Boston Red Sox Hall of Fame

See also
Chickasha Chiefs players

References

External links
 Chickasha - Baseball Reference

Defunct minor league baseball teams
Sports teams in Oklahoma
Grady County, Oklahoma
Baseball teams established in 1948
Baseball teams disestablished in 1952
Defunct baseball teams in Oklahoma
Professional baseball teams in Oklahoma